Zica Manuhi, also written as Zika or Sika (born 23 July 1993) is a Vanuatuan footballer who plays as a midfielder for Tafea. He made his debut for the national team on March 25, 2016, in their 1–0 win against New Caledonia.

References

External links
 
 Zica Manuhi at Oceania Football Center
 

1993 births
Living people
Vanuatuan footballers
Association football defenders
Vanuatu international footballers
Vanuatu under-20 international footballers
2016 OFC Nations Cup players